Mulliken may refer to:

 Mulliken, Michigan, a village in the United States

People with the surname:

 Bill Mulliken (1939–2014), American Olympic swimmer
 Harry B. Mulliken (1872–1952), American architect and developer
Robert S. Mulliken (1896–1986), American physicist

See also
Mullikin, a surname
Millikan (disambiguation)